The crescent is a Pictish symbol of unknown meaning, that is generally found in combination with an overlaid V-rod on Class I and Class II Pictish stones and infrequently without (as is the case on the Drosten Stone). The symbol is found in various combinations with other symbols, notably with the double disc and z-rod.
The crescent with V-rod is the most frequent symbol, roughly 1 in 5, while the next most frequent symbols, the double-disc and Z-rod and Pictish beast, are half this at roughly 1 in 10.

Gallery

References

Symbols on Pictish stones